The Jamuna River ( Jomuna) is one of the three main rivers of Bangladesh. It is the lower stream of the Brahmaputra River, which originates in Tibet as Yarlung Tsangpo, before flowing into India and then southwest into Bangladesh. The Jamuna flows south and joins the Padma River (Pôdda), near Goalundo Ghat, before meeting the Meghna River near Chandpur. It then flows into the Bay of Bengal as the Meghna River.

The Brahmaputra-Jamuna is a classic example of a braided river and is highly susceptible to channel migration and avulsion.
It is characterised by a network of interlacing channels with numerous sandbars enclosed between them. The sandbars, known in Bengali as chars, do not occupy a permanent position. The river deposits them in one year, very often to be destroyed later, and redeposits them in the next rainy season. The process of bank and deposit erosion together with redeposition has been going on continuously, making it difficult to precisely demarcate the boundary between the district of Pabna on one side and the districts of Mymensingh, Tangail and Dhaka on the other. The breaking of a char or the emergence of a new one is also a cause of much violence and litigation. The confluence of the Jamuna River and Padma River is unusually unstable and has been shown to have migrated southeast by over fourteen kilometres between 1972 and 2014.

Course

In Bangladesh, the Brahmaputra is joined by the Teesta River (or Tista), one of its largest tributaries.

James Rennell made a survey between 1764 and 1777 and his maps are one of the earliest authentic maps of Bengal in existence. In these maps Teesta is shown as flowing through North Bengal in several branches — Punarbhaba, Atrai, Karatoya, etc. All these streams combined lower down with the Mahananda, now the westernmost river in North Bengal, and taking the name of Hoorsagar finally discharged into the Ganges at Jafarganj, near modern Goalundo. The Hoorsagar river is still in existence, being the combined outfall of the Baral, a spill channel of the Ganges, the Atrai, the Jamuna or Jamuneswari (not the main Jamuna through which the Brahmaputra now flows), and the Karatoya, but instead of falling into the Ganges, it falls into the main Jamuna, a few kilometres above its confluence with the Padma at Goalundo.

Below the Teesta, the Brahmaputra splits into two distributary branches. The western branch, which contains the majority of the river's flow, continues due south as the Jamuna to merge with the lower Ganges, called the Padma River. The eastern branch, formerly the larger but now much smaller, is called the lower or Old Brahmaputra. It curves southeast to join the Meghna River near Dhaka. The Padma and Meghna converge near Chandpur and flow out into the Bay of Bengal. This final part of the river is called Meghna.

In the past the course of the lower Brahmaputra was different and passed through the Jamalpur and Mymensingh districts. In a major magnitude earthquake on April 2, 1762, the main channel of the Brahmaputra at Bhahadurabad point was switched southwards and opened as Jamuna due to the result of tectonic uplift of the Madhupur tract.

The Jamuna is a very wide river.

The Jamuna was a barrier in establishing a direct road link between capital Dhaka and northern part of Bangladesh, better known as Rajshahi Division, until 1996. This was mitigated by the completion of the Jamuna Multi-purpose Bridge. It is also a very important waterway. It is navigable all year round by large cargo and passenger steamers. Before the Partition of Bengal in 1947, passenger steamers used to ply up to Dibrugarh in the state of Assam in the Indian Union. At present two steamer ferry services link the district of Pabna with the districts of Mymensingh, Tangail and Dhaka. The Bangladesh Railway maintains a ferry service between Serajganj in Pabna and Jagannathganj in Mymensingh. The other ferry service between Nagarbari in Pabna and Aricha in Dhaka is run by the C & B Department.

See also
 List of rivers in Bangladesh

References

External links

 

Rivers of Bangladesh
Distributaries of the Ganges
Rivers of Rajshahi Division